Narakorn Noomchansakul (born April 12, 1999) is a Thai professional footballer who plays as a midfielder.

International goals

under-19

Honours

International
Thailand U23
 Southeast Asian Games  Silver medal: 2021

References

External links
 https://int.soccerway.com/players/narakorn-noomchansakool/495111/

1999 births
Living people
Narakorn Noomchansakul
Association football midfielders
Narakorn Noomchansakul
Narakorn Noomchansakul
Narakorn Noomchansakul
Competitors at the 2021 Southeast Asian Games
Narakorn Noomchansakul
Narakorn Noomchansakul